Dominic Inglot and Austin Krajicek were the reigning champions from when the tournament was last held in 2019, but chose not to participate this year.

Reilly Opelka and Jannik Sinner won the title, defeating Steve Johnson and Jordan Thompson in the final, 6–4, 6–7(6–8), [10–3].

Seeds

Draw

Draw

References

External Links
 Main Draw

Atlanta Open - Doubles
2021 Doubles
2021 US Open Series